Platymantis bayani is a species of frog in the family Ceratobatrachidae. It is endemic to the island of Samar, the Philippines. It is only known from its type locality, the Taft Forest Reserve in Taft, Eastern Samar. The specific name bayani is derived from the Tagalog word meaning "highly respected", "heroic", or "hero". The name honors , in recognition of his "numerous contributions to Philippine herpetology and … lifelong commitment to the study of biodiversity in the SW Pacific." Accordingly, common name Walter's limestone forest frog has been proposed for this species.

Description
Adult males measure  and adult females  in snout–vent length. The overall appearance is robust, and the head is broad. The tympanum is distinct. The fingers are slender, long, and bear greatly expanded terminal discs, as do the toes. The toes have some basal webbing. The dorsum and head are mottled light green, dark green, and black and bear low, salmon-colored tubercles. There is a distinct interorbital bar. The limbs have alternating dark brown and green transverse bars on their dorsal surfaces. The flanks have series of dark brown to black blotches and spots. The iris is  mottled golden-brown and dark brown, with a bright gold ciliary ring surrounding the pupil.

Habitat and conservation
Both males and females were observed perched on top of limestone rocks within large rock formations in the forest; they were well camouflaged against this background. This species has never been observed perching in trees or shrubs, as most closely related species do. Breeding is probably direct, with eggs presumably deposited in limestone crevices and small caves.

Platymantis bayani was quite common at the type locality. It is possible that it has a broader distribution, but its range is probably restricted by the presence of relatively undisturbed limestone formations with forest cover. It is primarily threatened by limestone quarrying and mining for the cement industry. Forest clearing for shifting agriculture, wood collection for firewood and charcoal production, and commercial illegal logging constitute additional threats.

References

bayani
Amphibians of the Philippines
Endemic fauna of the Philippines
Fauna of Samar
Amphibians described in 2009
Taxa named by Angel Chua Alcala
Taxa named by Rafe M. Brown
Taxa named by Arvin Cantor Diesmos
Taxa named by Cameron D. Siler